Olive Emily Jones (20 June 1893 – 26 December 1982) was a New Zealand potter.

Biography

Jones was born in Onehunga, Auckland, New Zealand on 20 June 1893.

Career

Jones was elected a life member of the New Zealand Society of Potters in 1965, together with Elizabeth Matheson and Oswold Stephens. For six months between 1939 and 1940 Jones demonstrated and exhibited her work at the New Zealand Centennial Exhibition .

She exhibited with the Christchurch-based art association, The Group, in 1950.

Her works are held in  Museum of New Zealand Te Papa Tongarewa, MTG Hawke's Bay and Auckland War Memorial Museum.

In 2017, works by Jones were included in an exhibition of early New Zealand female potters, held in West Auckland.

References

1893 births
1982 deaths
New Zealand potters
People from Auckland
Women potters
20th-century ceramists
New Zealand ceramicists
New Zealand women ceramicists
People associated with The Group (New Zealand art)